The South Wales League was a football league in South Wales. It ran between 1891 and 1911, closing down in September 1911 before the start of the planned 1911–12 season.

History
The league was formed in 1891. Treharris were the first champions after a disorganised first season which was concluded by the top three clubs playing off for the championship.   The next three seasons were affected by unplayed matches; and at the completion of the 1893–94 season, the management committee announced the winding up of the league. For the next two seasons, the league trophy was played for as a junior cup competition. The league restarted for the 1896–97 season and grew in numbers, eventually adding a second division, which operated without promotion or relegation.

In 1904 another league formed in South Wales, the Rhymney Valley League, which later became the Glamorgan League, eventually becoming the Welsh Football League. The new league was effectively a junior league, with many South Wales League teams having teams in both leagues. During the 1909–10 season, some of the older teams left the league and the 1910–11 season was problematic. The league announced that 11 clubs would play the 1911–12 season, but the management committee cancelled the season in September 1911 with an initial plan to take a season off. The league never returned.

Champions

1890–91: Treharris
1891–92: Treharris
1892–93: Cardiff
1893–94: Rogerstone
1894–95: League inactive
1895–96: League inactive
1896–97: Porth
1897–98: Rogerstone
1898–99: Aberdare 
1899–1900: Aberdare
1900–01: Rogerstone
1901–02: Barry Unionist Athletic
1902–03: Aberaman
1903–04: Ebbw Vale
1904–05: Treharris
1905–06: Treharris
1906–07: Newport (Res?)
1907–08: Treharris
1908–09: Ebbw Vale
1909–10: Cwm-parc & Treorchy United 
1910–11: Tredegar

See also
Football in Wales
Welsh football league system
List of football clubs in Wales

References

Football leagues in Wales
Sports leagues established in 1891
Sports leagues disestablished in 1911
1911 disestablishments in Wales
1891 establishments in Wales
Defunct football competitions in Wales